Anastasiya Podobed (born 27 August 1973) is a Belarusian sailor. She competed in the Europe event at the 1996 Summer Olympics.

References

External links
 

1973 births
Living people
Belarusian female sailors (sport)
Olympic sailors of Belarus
Sailors at the 1996 Summer Olympics – Europe
Place of birth missing (living people)